Nandiwanaparthy or Nandi Wanaparthy is a village in Ranga Reddy district in Telangana, India. It falls under Yacharam mandal. There are three old temples in this village, a popular Nandi temple, the Siddeshwara Temple, and the Shiva's Temple. The last of the three is called by the name Sri Sri Onkareshwara Swamy and was constructed about 100 years ago with the blessings of saint Sri Sri Bramhananda Yogananda Purnananda Swamy, who used to appear in many places at a time and bless his disciples. He also used to go to "Bugruha" (Suranga) and bring whatever was needed for constructing the temple.

History

Geography

Religious places 

Famous Nandi temple

Transport

Politics 

Sarpanch: vudayisri TRS has elected on January 25

Schools

Agriculture

References

Villages in Ranga Reddy district